Frecăţei may refer to several places in Romania:

 Frecăţei, a commune in Brăila County
 Frecăţei, a commune in Tulcea County
 Frecăţei, a village in Moviliţa Commune, Vrancea County